"The Tracks of My Tears" is a song written by Smokey Robinson, Pete Moore, and Marv Tarplin. It is a multiple award-winning 1965 hit R&B song originally recorded by their group, The Miracles, on Motown's Tamla label. The Miracles' million-selling original version has been inducted into The Grammy Hall of Fame, has been ranked by the Recording Industry Association of America and The National Endowment for the Arts at  127 in its list of the "Songs of the Century" – the 365 Greatest Songs of the 20th Century, and has been selected by Rolling Stone as No. 50 on its list of "The 500 Greatest Songs of All Time", among many other awards.
In 2021, Rolling Stone ranked The Miracles' original recording of "The Tracks of My Tears" as "The Greatest Motown Song of All Time."

The Miracles original version

Background
"The Tracks of My Tears" was written by Miracles members Smokey Robinson (lead vocalist), Pete Moore (bass vocalist), and Marv Tarplin (guitarist).

In the five-LP publication The Motown Story, by Motown Records, Robinson explained the origin of this song in these words: 
"'Tracks of My Tears' was actually started by Marv Tarplin, who is a young cat who plays guitar for our act. So he had this musical thing [sings melody], you know, and we worked around with it, and worked around, and it became 'Tracks of My Tears'." Tarplin's guitar licks at the song's intro are among the most famous in pop music history.

"The Tracks of My Tears"was a No. 2 hit on the Billboard R&B chart, and it reached No. 16 on the Billboard Hot 100. On initial release in the UK in 1965 it did not chart, but like several other Motown singles reissued there in 1969, it became a Top Ten hit in the summer, reaching No. 9, credited to "Smokey Robinson and the Miracles". This song is considered to be among the finest recordings of The Miracles, and it sold over one million records within two years, making it The Miracles' fourth million-selling record.  Billboard described the song as a "first rate teen ballad with pulsating dance beat."  Cash Box described it as "a slow-shufflin’ pop-r&b tearjerker about a gal who has several regrets about losing her guy."

The Miracles can be seen performing "The Tracks of My Tears" on their 2006 Motown DVD release, The Miracles' Definitive Performances.

Awards and accolades
"The Tracks of My Tears" is The Miracles ' most-honored and most-covered song. It has been ranked at, or near the top of many "best of" lists in the music industry over the last 50 years, and has won numerous industry awards and accolades. The Miracles' original recording of "The Tracks of My Tears" ranked at No. 50 on Rolling Stone'''s The 500 Greatest Songs of All Time in 2004; the track was also a 2007 inductee into the Grammy Hall of Fame. On May 14, 2008, the track was preserved by the United States Library of Congress as an "culturally, historically, and aesthetically significance" to the National Recording Registry. The song "The Tracks of My Tears" was also awarded "The Award of Merit" from The American Society of Composers, Authors, and Publishers (ASCAP) for Miracles members/composers Pete Moore, Marv Tarplin, and Smokey Robinson.

Ranked by the RIAA and the National Endowment for the Arts at No. 127 in its list of the Songs of the Century - the 365 Greatest Songs of the 20th Century - "The Tracks of My Tears" was also chosen as one of The Rock and Roll Hall of Fame's 500 Songs that Shaped Rock and Roll. Additionally, the song ranked at No. 5 on the "Top 10 Best Songs of All Time" by a panel of 20 top industry songwriters and producers including Hal David, Paul McCartney, Brian Wilson, Jerry Leiber, and others as reported to Britain's Mojo music magazine.
In 2021, Rolling Stone ranked The Miracles' original recording of "The Tracks of My Tears" as "The Greatest Motown Song of All Time."

Charts

Weekly charts

Year-end charts

Certifications

Personnel
The Miracles
 Smokey Robinson – lead vocals, co-writer
 Marv Tarplin – guitar, co-writer
 Claudette Rogers Robinson – background vocals 
 Pete Moore – background vocals, vocal arranger, co-writer 
 Ronnie White – background vocals 
 Bobby Rogers – background vocals
 Other instrumentation by the Funk Brothers and the Detroit Symphony Orchestra

Linda Ronstadt version

Background
In 1975, Linda Ronstadt recorded a cover version of "The Tracks of My Tears" for her studio album Prisoner in Disguise that became a pop Top 40 hit in the US. The single was produced by Peter Asher and issued on Asylum Records as that album's second single. Ronstadt's version of the song was a success peaking at No. 25 on the Billboard Hot 100 chart, reaching No. 11 on the Billboard C&W chart in tandem with its B-side: the Emmylou Harris duet "The Sweetest Gift", and No. 42 in 1976 on the UK Singles Chart.

Ronstadt later scored another of her biggest hits with her 1978 single "Ooh Baby Baby" which was a remake of the Miracles' hit single release precedent to "The Tracks of My Tears". Ronstadt and Smokey Robinson performed both "The Tracks of My Tears" and "Ooh Baby Baby" on the Motown 25: Yesterday, Today, Forever special broadcast on May 16, 1983.

Chart performance

Weekly charts

Year-end charts

Other versions
 In 1967, "The Tracks of My Tears" was covered by Johnny Rivers. His version of the song reached No. 10 on the Billboard Hot 100 chart, and No. 8 in Canada.
 Aretha Franklin recorded the song for her Soul '69 album from which it was issued as a single although as the B-side. Franklin's version of "The Weight" became the favored track with "Tracks of My Tears" peaking at No. 76 Pop and No. 21 R&B.
 Shirley covered the song in 1977, reaching No. 20 in Australia.
 A 1982 version by Colin Blunstone reached No. 60 in the UK Singles Chart.
 English pop duo Go West covered the song as "Tracks of My Tears" and released it as a single on September 20, 1993. Their version reached No. 16 on the UK Singles Chart, No. 38 on the Icelandic Singles Chart, and No. 82 on the Canadian RPM'' Top Singles chart.

References

Bibliography

External links
 See The Miracles perform the song on YouTube
 List of cover versions of "The Tracks of My Tears" at SecondHandSongs.com

1965 songs
1965 singles
1967 singles
1969 singles
1975 singles
1993 singles
2007 singles
Motown singles
United States National Recording Registry recordings
Grammy Hall of Fame Award recipients
The Miracles songs
Aretha Franklin songs
Johnny Rivers songs
Linda Ronstadt songs
Go West (band) songs
Songs written by Smokey Robinson
Songs written by Warren "Pete" Moore
Songs written by Marv Tarplin
Songs about loneliness
Song recordings produced by Smokey Robinson
Tamla Records singles
Song recordings produced by Peter Asher
Chrysalis Records singles
Asylum Records singles